The 2016 Denver Broncos season was the franchise's 47th season in the National Football League (NFL) and the 57th overall. It was also the second season under head coach Gary Kubiak, as well as the final season of Kubiak's Broncos tenure, as he retired at the end of the season due to health concerns.

The Broncos entered the season as defending champions of Super Bowl 50, after undergoing numerous roster changes as well as an off-season and preseason that was dominated by a quarterback controversy, following the retirement of Peyton Manning. Following a 4–0 start, the team sputtered down the stretch, missing the playoffs for the first time since 2010, as well as having their franchise-record streak of five consecutive playoff appearances and five consecutive AFC West division titles snapped. In addition, the Broncos became the 12th consecutive team to fail to repeat as Super Bowl champions, as well as the first reigning champion to miss the playoffs since the 2013 Baltimore Ravens. In terms of statistics, the Broncos' offense scored more than 30 points only once. Head coach Gary Kubiak abruptly resigned at the end of the season citing health reasons but would remain as a consultant for the Broncos before returning to coaching in 2019 as the Assistant head coach/offensive coordinator for the Minnesota Vikings, where he spent 2 seasons in before retiring from coaching following the 2020 season.

As of 2023, this represents the most recent winning season for the Broncos.

Coaching changes
 February 12: Brian Callahan, who had served as the Broncos' offensive quality control coach since 2010, was hired as a quarterbacks coach with the Detroit Lions.
 February 16: Klint Kubiak, son of Broncos' head coach Gary Kubiak, was hired as the offensive quality control coach, replacing Brian Callahan. Klint Kubiak previously served as a coaching assistant with the Minnesota Vikings from 2013 to 2014, and was a wide receiver's coach at the University of Kansas in 2015.

Gary Kubiak's health problems
On October 9, shortly after the Broncos' Week 5 loss to the Atlanta Falcons, head coach Gary Kubiak was rushed to a Denver-area hospital, after experiencing flu-like symptoms and extreme body fatigue. According to executive vice president/general manager John Elway, Kubiak had been feeling ill prior to the loss to the Falcons, and following a precautionary MRI and CT scan, Kubiak was diagnosed with a "complex migraine." Special teams coordinator Joe DeCamillis served as the team's interim head coach for the team's Week 6 Thursday Night loss at the San Diego Chargers, while Kubiak underwent a doctor-mandated week of rest. This was the second time in three years in which Kubiak experienced a health scare—in November 2013, while serving as the Houston Texans' head coach, Kubiak suffered a mini-stroke after collapsing on the field during a game against the Indianapolis Colts. Concerns over his health ultimately resulted in Kubiak retiring from coaching at the end of the season.

Roster changes

Free agents

Unrestricted

Restricted

Exclusive-Rights

Signings

Departures

Retirement of Peyton Manning
On March 7, two days before the start of the  league year, quarterback Peyton Manning retired after 18 NFL seasons. In his four seasons with the Broncos (2012–2015), Manning threw for 17,112 passing yards and 140 touchdowns, both second in franchise history behind John Elway. Manning also set numerous league records, including single-season passing yardage (5,477) and single-season touchdown passes (55), both of which were achieved in 2013.

Manning was also one of two remaining active players who were drafted and had played in the 1990s—the other being fellow 1998 draftee Charles Woodson of the Oakland Raiders. Woodson also retired following the 2015 season, making 2015 the last one to feature players drafted in the 1990s.

Trades
 March 11: The Broncos acquired quarterback Mark Sanchez in a trade that would have sent a 2017 seventh-round selection to the Philadelphia Eagles; however, Sanchez was released on September 2, voiding the trade.
 April 9: The Broncos were involved in a trade that sent offensive tackle Ryan Clady to the New York Jets (see draft section below).
 October 25: The Broncos acquired tight end A. J. Derby in a trade that sent a 2017 fifth-round selection to the New England Patriots.

Draft

Draft trades

Undrafted free agents
All undrafted free agents were signed after the 2016 NFL draft concluded on April 30, unless noted otherwise.

Suspensions
On August 12, safety Shiloh Keo was suspended for the first two games of the  season for violating the league's substance abuse policy. The suspension was a result of a DUI arrest in Idaho in February.

Injuries
 August 12: One day after the Broncos' first preseason game against the Chicago Bears, wide receiver Bennie Fowler revealed that he suffered a fractured elbow after blocking a punt. Fowler missed the first two games of the season.
 August 15: Defensive end Vance Walker suffered a ruptured ACL in his right knee during practice, and was placed on the season-ending injured reserve four days later (August 19).
 September 18: Linebacker DeMarcus Ware suffered an ulna fracture in his right forearm, during the Broncos' Week 2 win over the Indianapolis Colts. Ware collided with teammate Von Miller, with both converging on a sack attempt of Colts' quarterback Andrew Luck. Ware missed six weeks of action, before returning in Week 8.
 October 24: Running back C. J. Anderson suffered an injury to his right knee during the first quarter of the Broncos' Week 7 win over the Houston Texans, though he returned in the second quarter and played the remainder of the game. Two days later (October 26), media reports indicated that Anderson missed practice and sought multiple medical opinions on his knee. After an MRI revealed that he suffered meniscus damage, Anderson was placed on injured reserve, and will miss a minimum of eight weeks. Also on October 24, linebacker Brandon Marshall suffered a hamstring injury, and missed the team's Week 9 loss to the Oakland Raiders.
 November 6: Defensive tackle Derek Wolfe suffered a hairline fracture in his elbow during the team's Week 9 loss to the Oakland Raiders, and missed the team's Week 10 win over the New Orleans Saints.
 Weeks 8–10: Cornerback Aqib Talib missed three games due to a lower back injury.
 December 1: Fullback Andy Janovich, the team's sixth-round draft selection, was placed on injured reserve, after undergoing ankle surgery two days earlier.
 December 6: Running back Kapri Bibbs was placed on the season-ending injured reserve, after suffering a high ankle sprain during the team's Week 13 win over the Jacksonville Jaguars.
 December 10: Wide receiver Marlon Brown was placed on injured reserve due to recurring back injuries.
 December 16: Long snapper Casey Kreiter was placed on injured reserve, four weeks after suffering a calf injury during the team's Week 10 win over the New Orleans Saints.

Brandon Marshall

Linebacker Brandon Marshall missed multiple games due to a hamstring injury – the Broncos' Week 6 loss to the San Diego Chargers as well as the team's Week 14 loss to the Tennessee Titans.

Trevor Siemian

Quarterback Trevor Siemian missed two games due to injury. He suffered a sprain to his non-throwing shoulder during the team's Week 4 win over the Tampa Bay Buccaneers that kept him out of the Broncos' Week 5 loss to the Atlanta Falcons the following week. Siemian also suffered a sprained foot during the Broncos' Week 12 loss to the Kansas City Chiefs that kept him out of the team's Week 13 win over the Jacksonville Jaguars the following week. Backup quarterback Paxton Lynch, the team's first-round draft selection, filled in for Siemian in Weeks 4, 5 and 13.

Quarterback selection
Following the retirement of Peyton Manning, the Broncos underwent a process to select a new quarterback throughout the entire off-season and preseason. Brock Osweiler, Manning's backup quarterback from 2012 to 2015, signed with the Houston Texans as a free agent. Mark Sanchez was acquired in a trade with the Philadelphia Eagles, and the Broncos selected Paxton Lynch during the first round of the draft. Sanchez, Lynch and second-year quarterback Trevor Siemian competed for the starting quarterback position, with Siemian being named the starting quarterback for the start of the regular season and Sanchez being released on September 3. Following Sanchez's release, the Broncos signed Austin Davis, who was later waived on December 23.

Staff

Final roster

Preseason

Regular season

Schedule
As the result of winning Super Bowl 50, the Broncos earned the right to host the Week 1 kickoff game on Thursday, September 8, in a Super Bowl rematch vs. the Carolina Panthers. The Broncos'  schedule was announced on April 14.

Note: Intra-division opponents are in bold text.

Game summaries

Week 1: vs. Carolina Panthers
NFL Kickoff game

In a rematch of Super Bowl 50, the defending champion Broncos played host to the Carolina Panthers, in the opening kickoff game. This was the Panthers' first visit to Denver since . Following a fumble on the Broncos' initial possession, the Panthers grabbed the early lead, with a 14-yard touchdown pass from quarterback Cam Newton to wide receiver Kelvin Benjamin. The Broncos responded early in the second quarter, with a 28-yard touchdown by fullback Andy Janovich on his first rushing attempt. The Panthers then re-claimed the lead, with Newton rushing for a 2-yard touchdown, in an 18-play, 89-yard drive that took nine minutes off the clock. After the Broncos' offense went three-and-out, the Panthers added to their lead just before halftime, with a 44-yard field goal by placekicker Graham Gano.

Following a scoreless third quarter, the Broncos pulled to within a 17–14 deficit on the first play of the fourth quarter, with quarterback Trevor Siemian connecting on a 25-yard touchdown pass to running back C. J. Anderson. On the second play of the Panthers' next drive, Newton was intercepted by cornerback Chris Harris Jr. at the Panthers' 38-yard line, giving the Broncos excellent field position. Ten plays later, the Broncos grabbed their first lead of the game, with Anderson rushing up the middle for a 1-yard touchdown at the 9:30 mark of the fourth quarter. The Panthers methodically marched down the field, hoping to re-claim the lead, but had to settle for a 36-yard field goal by Gano to pull to within a 21–20 deficit with 4:25 remaining.

After the Broncos' went three-and-out, the Panthers had one last offensive possession. On the first play after the two-minute warning, the Panthers were facing a 4th-and-21 at their own 29-yard line, and a pass from Newton intended for Benjamin was incomplete, however, Harris was flagged for an illegal hands to the face penalty, giving a Panthers an automatic first down. With 47 seconds remaining, Newton was penalized for intentional grounding with the Panthers' at their own 47-yard line, however, Broncos' cornerback Darian Stewart was penalized for roughing the passer, with a helmet hit on Newton, resulting in both penalties offsetting. With only 14 seconds remaining, Newton completed a crucial pass to wide receiver Ted Ginn Jr. at the Broncos' 32-yard line, setting up Gano for a potential game-winning field goal. After the Broncos called a timeout in order to ice the kicker, Gano's 50-yard field goal attempt sailed wide left, sealing the win for the Broncos.

Notes

Andy Janovich became only the third player in Broncos' franchise history to score on his first rushing attempt; the other two are fullback Kyle Johnson and quarterback Bradlee Van Pelt, both of which occurred in 2005.

Week 2: vs. Indianapolis Colts

The two teams exchanged field goals in the first quarter, with a 48-yarder by Colts' placekicker Adam Vinatieri and a 23-yarder by Broncos' placekicker Brandon McManus. A 4-yard touchdown run by running back C. J. Anderson gave the Broncos the lead early in the second quarter. Vinatieri and McManus once again exchanged field goals late in the first half, with a 52-yarder by Vinatieri and a 43-yarder by McManus just before halftime. The Colts took the initial possession of the second half and tied the game at 13–13 midway through the third quarter, with running back Robert Turbin rushing for a 5-yard touchdown. However, the Broncos took the lead for good later in the third quarter, with a 33-yard field goal by McManus. On the Colts' next possession, quarterback Andrew Luck was intercepted by Broncos' cornerback Aqib Talib, who scampered 46 yards down the sideline for a touchdown to give the Broncos a 23–13 lead early in the fourth quarter. Following an exchange of punts, the Colts narrowed the Broncos' lead, with Luck connecting with running back Frank Gore on a 7-yard touchdown pass with four minutes remaining in the game. The Broncos then increased their lead to 26–20 on the first play after the two-minute warning, with McManus' fourth field goal of the game—a 35-yarder—and in the process, forced the Colts to burn all three of their timeouts. The Colts had one last offensive possession, hoping for a game-winning drive, however, on the very first play from scrimmage, Luck was strip-sacked by Broncos' linebacker Von Miller, and linebacker Shane Ray returned the fumble 15 yards for a game-clinching touchdown (with a two-point conversion pass from quarterback Trevor Siemian to wide receiver Demaryius Thomas).

Notes

Demaryius Thomas passed Ed McCaffrey for fourth-place on the Broncos' all-time career receptions list – at the time, Thomas only trailed Lionel Taylor, Shannon Sharpe and Rod Smith, and surpassed Taylor in 2017. This was the only game during the  season in which the Broncos scored 30 or more points.

Week 3: at Cincinnati Bengals

The Bengals grabbed the lead on their opening possession, with running back Jeremy Hill rushing for a 3-yard touchdown. The Broncos drove down to near the goal line on their second possession, which was aided by two Bengals' defensive penalties, however, the Broncos were forced to settle for a 20-yard field goal by placekicker Brandon McManus. Following a Bengals' fumble on a punt return near midfield, the Broncos took the lead, with quarterback Trevor Siemian connecting on a 41-yard touchdown pass to wide receiver Emmanuel Sanders. Following an exchange of punts, the Bengals went back ahead, with Hill rushing for his second touchdown from 4 yards out. The Broncos responded, with Siemian throwing another touchdown pass to Sanders from 7 yards out. However, the extra point attempt was blocked. Following a scoreless third quarter, a 34-yard field goal by placekicker Mike Nugent gave the Bengals a 17–16 lead early in the fourth quarter. The Broncos then assembled a 13-play, 82-yard drive, culminating with Siemian firing a 1-yard touchdown pass to tight end John Phillips (with an unsuccessful two-point conversion attempt). After the Bengals went three-and-out on their next possession, in which wide receiver A. J. Green dropped a critical third-down pass play, the Broncos added to their lead, with Siemian throwing his fourth touchdown of the game—a 55-yarder to wide receiver Demaryius Thomas with 4:32 remaining in the game. The Broncos' defense stood their ground on the Bengals' last two possessions.

Notes

Trevor Siemian became the first quarterback in NFL history to throw for 300 yards and four touchdowns without an interception in a first career road start. With linebacker Shane Ray recording three sacks, this was the first time in franchise history in which the Broncos had two different players record 3+ sacks in a single game; linebacker Von Miller achieved three sacks vs. the Indianapolis Colts during the previous week.

Week 4: at Tampa Bay Buccaneers

The Broncos made their first visit to Tampa Bay since 2004. Cornerback Aqib Talib, who made his return to Tampa Bay where he played for the Buccaneers from 2008 to 2012, intercepted Buccaneers' quarterback Jameis Winston on the third play of the opening drive. The Broncos immediately capitalized, with quarterback Trevor Siemian throwing an 11-yard touchdown to wide receiver Demaryius Thomas. On the Buccaneers' next drive, a 7-yard touchdown run by Winston tied the game, which would be the Buccaneers' only scoring play of the game. Following another interception of Winston by Talib, the Broncos re-claimed the lead, with a 1-yard touchdown run by running back C. J. Anderson. With 3:25 remaining in the first half, Siemian injured his non-throwing shoulder when he was sacked by defensive tackle Clinton McDonald, and backup quarterback Paxton Lynch, the team's first-round draft selection, took over in his NFL debut. Placekicker Brandon McManus added two field goals—a 38-yarder just before halftime and a 24-yarder midway through the third quarter. Lynch later threw his first touchdown pass—a 5-yarder to wide receiver Emmanuel Sanders—which put the game out of reach. At the 6:52 mark of the fourth quarter, the game was delayed for an hour and a half due to a severe weather threat in the Tampa area.

Week 5: vs. Atlanta Falcons

The Falcons, making their first visit to Denver since , took a 10–0 lead in the first quarter, with running back Devonta Freeman rushing for a 1-yard touchdown, followed by a 46-yard field goal by placekicker Matt Bryant. The Broncos, with quarterback Paxton Lynch, playing in place of the injured Trevor Siemian, punted on their first two possessions, and got on the scoreboard early in the second quarter, with a 35-yard field goal by placekicker Brandon McManus. Following an exchange of punts, a 33-yard field goal by Bryant just after the two-minute warning extended the Falcons' lead, in a drive that took seven minutes off the clock. In the third quarter, Lynch was intercepted by Falcons' safety Ricardo Allen at the Broncos' 42-yard line, and the Falcons capitalized, with quarterback Matt Ryan connecting on a 31-yard touchdown pass to running back Tevin Coleman to extend to a 20–3 lead. On the Falcons' next drive, Broncos' safety T. J. Ward forced a fumble off wide receiver Mohamed Sanu at midfield, though the Broncos had to settle for a 46-yard field goal by McManus early in the fourth quarter. The Falcons responded, with a 25-yard field goal by McManus to extend to a 23–6 lead with 8:24 remaining in the game. Hoping for a rally, the Broncos went on a 16-play, 78-yard drive, culminating in a 3-yard touchdown pass from Lynch to wide receiver Demaryius Thomas with 2:43 remaining. After an unsuccessful onside kick attempt, the Broncos' defense forced a three-and-out, but were forced to use all of their team timeouts prior to the two-minute warning. The Broncos advanced 44 yards in 7 plays, and pulled to within a 23–16 deficit, with a 45-yard field goal by McManus with only 19 seconds remaining. However, another onside kick attempt was unsuccessful, sealing the win for the Falcons.

Notes

Demaryius Thomas became the third player in Broncos' franchise history to achieve 50 career touchdowns; the other two are Shannon Sharpe (55) and Rod Smith (68).

Week 6: at San Diego Chargers

The Chargers scored took a 10–0 lead, with quarterback Philip Rivers connecting on a 5-yard touchdown pass to tight end Hunter Henry, followed in the second quarter by a 37-yard field goal by placekicker Josh Lambo. Chargers' return specialist Travis Benjamin fumbled a punt return at the Chargers' 11-yard line, however, the Broncos did not gain any yardage, and were forced to settle for a 29-yard field goal by placekicker Brandon McManus. Three third-quarter field goals by Lambo—from 21, 31 and 32 yards out—added to the Chargers' lead. The middle score occurred after a fumble by Broncos' wide receiver Jordan Taylor. McManus missed wide-right on a 56-yard field goal at the end of the third quarter. Early in the fourth quarter, the Broncos' defense forced a Chargers' punt that backed up the Broncos to their own 3-yard line.

On the next play from scrimmage, Broncos' offensive tackle Russell Okung was penalized for holding in the end zone that resulted in a safety, extending the Chargers' lead to 21–3. On the ensuing free kick, the Chargers committed another special teams turnover, with guard Kenny Wiggins fumbling the kick near midfield. The Broncos capitalized on this turnover, with a 5-yard touchdown pass from quarterback Trevor Siemian to wide receiver Bennie Fowler. The Broncos' defense forced a three-and-out on the Chargers' next possession with six minutes remaining in the game. On the sixth play of the Broncos' next drive, Siemian connected with running back C. J. Anderson on a 20-yard touchdown, however, another costly holding penalty on Okung negated the scoring play. Two plays later, Siemian connected on a pass completion to wide receiver Demaryius Thomas to the Chargers' 13-yard line, however, Chargers' linebacker Jatavis Brown forced a fumble off Thomas, which was recovered by cornerback Craig Mager, ending the drive with 3:35 remaining. The Broncos' defense forced another three-and-out, but used all three of their team timeouts in the process. A 46-yard field goal by McManus with 32 seconds remaining pulled the Broncos to within a 21–13 deficit. The Broncos recovered the onside kick at their own 46-yard line, however, four plays later, a desperation hail mary pass by Siemian fell short of the end zone.

Notes

Special teams coordinator Joe DeCamillis served as interim head coach, while Gary Kubiak recovered from a migraine condition that he suffered during the previous week. As part of the NFL Color Rush program, the Broncos wore all-orange throwback uniforms. With the loss, the Broncos' NFL-record 15-game road winning streak against division opponents came to an end. This was the Broncos' final game in San Diego, as the Chargers relocated to Los Angeles after the  season.

Week 7: vs. Houston Texans

The Broncos' defense surrendered only three field goals by Texans' placekicker Nick Novak, and spoiled quarterback Brock Osweiler's return to Denver, allowing only 131 passing yards. Osweiler spent the previous four seasons (2012–2015) as Peyton Manning's backup quarterback, and started seven games in 2015 while Manning was injured. The Broncos scored three offensive touchdowns: a 4-yard pass from quarterback Trevor Siemian to Demaryius Thomas, plus two rushing touchdowns, one from C. J. Anderson, and the other from rookie Devontae Booker. Placekicker Brandon McManus also added two field goals.

Notes

This was the first of two games in which the Broncos wore wear their alternate navy blue uniforms – the other was Week 15 vs. the New England Patriots. This was Broncos' head coach Gary Kubiak's first victory against the Texans, for whom he coached from 2006 to 2013, as well as Kubiak's return to the sideline following a health scare that forced him to miss the team's Week 6 loss to the San Diego Chargers.

During halftime, three former Broncos were inducted into the Ring of Fame: Placekicker Jason Elam, who played with the Broncos from 1993 to 2007 and is the franchise's all-time leader in field goals (395) and points scored (1,786); defensive lineman Simon Fletcher, who played with the Broncos from 1985 to 1995 and is the franchise's all-time leader in sacks (97.5) and consecutive games played (172); safety John Lynch, who played four seasons with the Broncos from 2004 to 2007.

Week 8: vs. San Diego Chargers

For the second time in a three-week span, the Broncos faced their AFC West rivals, the San Diego Chargers. Following a 28-yard field goal by placekicker Brandon McManus on the Broncos' opening possession, a 7-yard touchdown pass from quarterback Philip Rivers to tight end Antonio Gates gave the Chargers their only lead of the game. The Broncos' defense then proceeded to frustrate the Chargers' offense, including three interceptions of Rivers. In the second quarter, Broncos' cornerback Bradley Roby returned an interception 49 yards for a touchdown, and Chargers' placekicker Josh Lambo later missed on a 44-yard field goal attempt. On the Chargers' opening possession of the second half, the Broncos took advantage of a Rivers' interception deep in Chargers' territory, and added to their lead, with running back Devontae Booker rushing for a 3-yard touchdown. Rivers subsequently threw another interception deep in Chargers' territory, his third of the game; however, a fumble by Booker gave the football back to the Chargers. Thirteen plays and 98 yards later, the Chargers narrowed the Broncos' lead, with a 14-yard touchdown pass from Rivers to wide receiver Travis Benjamin. Broncos' linebacker Shaquil Barrett blocked the extra point attempt, keeping the score at 17–13.

The Broncos responded early in the fourth quarter, with running back Juwan Thompson rushing for a 1-yard touchdown. On the Broncos' next possession, quarterback Trevor Siemian was intercepted by Chargers' cornerback Casey Hayward, who returned the football 16 yards for a touchdown. The initial two-point conversion pass from Rivers to Gates was successful, however, it was nullified by an offensive pass interference penalty on Gates. Rivers' second attempt intended for tight end Hunter Henry was incomplete, keeping the score at 24–19 with 8:10 remaining in the game. Two long pass plays from Siemian—one to tight end Virgil Green for 31 yards and another to wide receiver Demaryius Thomas for 40 yards—gave the Broncos a first-and-goal at the 4-yard line. However, the Chargers' defense forced the Broncos to settle for a 22-yard field goal by McManus. The Chargers attempted a rally, and with 2:54 remaining, the Chargers had a first-and-goal at the 2-yard line, but Rivers threw four consecutive incompletions, the last of which was knocked away by Broncos' cornerback Lorenzo Doss at the goal line. While backed up deep in their own territory, the Broncos' offense went three-and-out, and were forced to punt, giving the Chargers one last possession. The Broncos' defense stood their ground, not allowing the Chargers to advance past midfield.

Notes

Broncos' defensive coordinator Wade Phillips was rushed to a Denver-area hospital, following a second-quarter sideline collision after Chargers' running back Melvin Gordon was blocked into him. Linebackers coach Reggie Herring filled in for Phillips for the remainder of the game.

Week 9: at Oakland Raiders

The Raiders dominated the time of possession by a 2–1 margin, and though the Broncos' defense limited Raiders' quarterback Derek Carr to 184 yards passing, running back Latavius Murray amassed 114 rushing yards as well as three touchdowns. The Broncos trailed 23–13 with eight minutes remaining in the game, and attempted a rally, however, quarterback Trevor Siemian was strip-sacked by Raiders' linebacker Khalil Mack, giving the Raiders a short field. A 1-yard touchdown by Murray extended the lead, a drive that was kept alive by one defensive holding and two pass interference penalties on Broncos' cornerback Chris Harris, Jr. On the Broncos' next drive, Siemian connected with running back Kapri Bibbs on a 69-yard touchdown pass to pull to within a 30–20 deficit, but the Broncos got no closer.

Week 10: at New Orleans Saints

The Broncos, making their first visit to New Orleans since , jumped out to a 10–0 lead. First, quarterback Trevor Siemian connected with wide receiver Jordan Taylor on a 14-yard touchdown pass. The touchdown was initially ruled as an incomplete pass, but overturned by a replay challenge. Following an interception of Saints' quarterback Drew Brees by cornerback Darian Stewart, placekicker Brandon McManus added a 50-yard field goal early in the second quarter. The Broncos were attempting to add to their lead just before halftime, however Siemian was intercepted by cornerback Sterling Moore, and the Saints quickly advanced 50 yards in only 29 seconds, culminating in a 30-yard field goal by placekicker Wil Lutz. Early in the third quarter, the Saints tied the game, with Brees connecting with wide receiver Willie Snead on a 3-yard touchdown pass. On the Broncos' second possession of the second half, Siemian was intercepted by safety Kenny Vaccaro, and four plays later, another touchdown pass from Brees to Snead from 5 yards out gave the Saints a 17–10 lead.

On the Broncos next drive, McManus missed wide left on a 42-yard field attempt early in the fourth quarter. Two plays into the Saints' next possession, Broncos' cornerback Bradley Roby forced a fumble off wide receiver Michael Thomas, which was recovered by Stewart at the Saints' 27-yard line. Seven plays later, the Broncos tied the game, with a 2-yard touchdown pass from Siemian to wide receiver Demaryius Thomas. After forcing the Saints to go three-and-out, the Broncos drove down the field, but had to settle on a 28-yard field goal by McManus. The Broncos' defense forced another fumble deep in Saints' territory, but had to settle on a 37-yard field goal by McManus with 2:50 remaining in the game, while forcing the Saints to burn the last two of their three team timeouts. The Saints then drove 75 yards in only six plays, culminating in Brees throwing a 32-yard touchdown pass to wide receiver Brandin Cooks to tie the game at 23–23 with 1:30 remaining in the game. However, Lutz's extra point attempt was blocked by Justin Simmons, and Will Parks scooped up the football and ran to the end zone for a defensive two-point conversion. The Saints sideline claimed that Parks may have stepped out of bounds, but the initial ruling on the field was upheld after an instant replay review. The Saints' onside kick attempt was unsuccessful, sealing the controversial win for the Broncos.

Notes

Darian Stewart became the Broncos' first defensive player since Deltha O'Neal in 2001 to record three takeaways in one game.

Week 12: vs. Kansas City Chiefs

After a scoreless first quarter, the Chiefs took a 9–0 lead midway through the second quarter. After Broncos quarterback Trevor Siemian was strip-sacked near the goal line, offensive tackle Russell Okung was tackled in the end zone trying to recover the fumble and the Chiefs were awarded a safety; running back Tyreek Hill then returned the ensuing free kick 86 yards for a touchdown. A 33-yard field goal by placekicker Brandon McManus just after the two-minute warning put the Broncos on the scoreboard. The Broncos grabbed the lead midway through the third quarter, with a 6-yard touchdown pass from Siemian to wide receiver Jordan Taylor. The Chiefs responded on their next possession, with Hill rushing for a 3-yard touchdown. The drive was extended after the Chiefs accepted an illegal formation penalty on the Broncos that nullified a 35-yard field goal by placekicker Cairo Santos. The Broncos re-claimed the lead midway through the fourth quarter, with a 35-yard touchdown pass from Siemian to wide receiver Emmanuel Sanders. After forcing a Chiefs' punt, the Broncos were attempting to run out the clock after earning a first down with 3:31 remaining in the game. Two plays later, and after the Chiefs had used all of their team timeouts, the Broncos extended their lead to 24–16, with a 76-yard touchdown pass from Siemian to wide receiver Bennie Fowler.

However, the Broncos' defense was unable to keep the Chiefs out of the end zone. Quarterback Alex Smith methodically engineered a game-tying 13-play, 75-yard drive, with a 3-yard touchdown pass to Hill, coupled with a two-point conversion pass to tight end Demetrius Harris. The play was initially ruled down at the 1-yard line with 15 seconds remaining, but overturned by instant replay, sending the game to overtime. The Broncos won the overtime coin toss, and the teams exchanged field goals on their initial possessions: a 44-yarder by Brandon McManus followed by a 37-yarder by Santos. The Broncos' next overtime possession commenced with 4:19 remaining, and drove to as far as the Chiefs' 44-yard line. Instead of a short punt, Broncos' head coach Gary Kubiak elected to send McManus onto the field for a potential game-winning 62-yard field goal, however, McManus attempt was both short and wide left, giving the Chiefs possession at the Broncos' 48-yard line with 1:08 remaining. Four plays later, and with five seconds remaining, Santos kicked the game-winning 34-yard field goal for the Chiefs, which initially caromed off the left upright.

Week 13: at Jacksonville Jaguars

For the second time this season, backup quarterback Paxton Lynch started in place of Trevor Siemian, who missed the game due to a sprained foot. Following a scoreless first quarter, a 47-yard field goal by placekicker Jason Myers gave the Jaguars the brief lead. The Broncos then reeled off 17 unanswered points, with a 6-yard touchdown run by running back Devontae Booker and a 32-yard field goal by placekicker Brandon McManus just before halftime. Then, in the third quarter, cornerback Bradley Roby returned an interception off quarterback Blake Bortles 51 yards for a touchdown. The Jaguars narrowed the Broncos' lead to 17–10 early in the fourth quarter, when Bortles ran for a 22-yard touchdown. Following an exchange of punts throughout the majority of the fourth quarter, the Jaguars were attempting a rally just after the two-minute warning, when Broncos' linebacker Shane Ray forced a strip sack and fumble recovery off Bortles in Jaguars' territory. Four plays later, McManus added a 41-yard field goal with only 33 seconds remaining to put the game out of reach.

Week 14: at Tennessee Titans

The Broncos' defense limited Titans' quarterback Marcus Mariota to only 88 yards passing on 6 of 20 attempts; however, the Titans controlled the first half time of possession by a 2–1 margin and led 10–0 in the first quarter. Running back DeMarco Murray rushed for a 1-yard touchdown and placekicker Ryan Succop kicked a 53-yard field goal; the latter scoring play occurred after the Titans' defense forced a fumble off Broncos' running back Justin Forsett. A 41-yard field goal by Succop just before halftime gave the Titans a 13–0 lead. The Broncos' offense did not cross midfield in the first half. After a scoreless third quarter, the Broncos were attempting to cut into the Titans' lead early in the fourth quarter, but the Titans' defense stopped the Broncos on a 4th-and-goal. After forcing a Titans' punt, the Broncos finally got on the scoreboard with ten minutes remaining in the game, with quarterback Trevor Siemian connecting on a 3-yard touchdown pass to wide receiver Emmanuel Sanders. After forcing a three-and-out from the Titans, the Broncos marched down to as far as the Titans' 16-yard line, but had to settle on a 34-yard field goal by placekicker Brandon McManus to narrow the Titans' lead to 13–10 with 4:33 remaining in the game. After forcing another Titans' punt, the Broncos had one last possession, hoping for a rally. With 1:04 remaining in the game, Siemian completed a pass to tight end A. J. Derby at the 41-yard line, however, Titans' linebacker Avery Williamson forced a fumble off Derby, which was recovered by safety Daimion Stafford to seal the win for the Titans.

Week 15: vs. New England Patriots

The Broncos' defense limited Patriots' quarterback Tom Brady to 188 yards passing and no touchdowns, but their defensive effort was wasted by a poor performance from their inconsistent offense. The Broncos' only scoring play was a 33-yard field goal by placekicker Brandon McManus. In the first quarter, a fumbled punt by Jordan Norwood led to a 45-yard field goal by Patriots' placekicker Stephen Gostkowski. An interception off Broncos' quarterback Trevor Siemian by cornerback Logan Ryan resulted in the only touchdown of the game—a 1-yard run by Patriots' running back LeGarrette Blount in the second quarter. Gostkowski added two more field goals—a 40-yarder in the third quarter and a 21-yarder in the fourth.

Notes

The Broncos wore their alternate navy blue uniforms for this game.

Week 16: at Kansas City Chiefs
NFL on Christmas Day

The Chiefs jumped out to a 21–7 lead at the end of the first quarter, consisting of a 10-yard touchdown run by quarterback Alex Smith, followed by Smith throwing a pair of touchdown passes—a 70-yarder to wide receiver Tyreek Hill and an 80-yarder to tight end Travis Kelce. The Broncos' only touchdown of the game was a 1-yard run by running back Justin Forsett, which occurred after a Justin Simmons' interception of Smith. A 52-yard field goal by placekicker Brandon McManus midway through the second quarter was the Broncos' only other scoring play of the game; a fake field goal attempt just before halftime was unsuccessful. After a scoreless third quarter, the Chiefs pulled away in the fourth quarter, with two field goals by placekicker Cairo Santos—from 27 and 39 yards out—and nose tackle Dontari Poe throwing a 1-yard touchdown pass to tight end Demetrius Harris (with a missed extra point). The latter field goal occurred after Broncos' return specialist Kalif Raymond muffed a punt return.

Notes

With the loss, the Broncos were eliminated from playoff contention for the first time since 2010, lost all three of their AFC West divisional road games for the first time since 2010 and suffered their first season sweep at the hands of the Chiefs since 2000. The Broncos' streak of five consecutive playoff appearances—the longest in franchise history—came to an end. For the first time since 1966, the Broncos' offense scored 10 of fewer points for a third consecutive game. The Broncos' defense surrendered 330 yards in the first half—the most the Broncos have surrendered in a half since 1981, and 484 for the entire game—the most since 2013.

This would also be the final career game of outside linebacker DeMarcus Ware, who would have season-ending back surgery the next week.

Week 17: vs. Oakland Raiders

The Broncos jumped out to a 24–0 lead midway through the third quarter and spoiled the Raiders' chances of earning the AFC West division title and a first-round bye. Running back Devontae Booker scored two touchdowns—an 11-yard run in the first quarter and on a 43-yard pass from quarterback Trevor Siemian, who also connected on a 2-yard touchdown pass to tight end Virgil Green in the third quarter. Placekicker Brandon McManus added a 22-yard field goal in the second quarter. The only scoring play allowed by the Broncos' defense was a 32-yard touchdown pass from Raiders' quarterback Connor Cook to wide receiver Amari Cooper. Cook substituted for starter Matt McGloin, who left the game in the second quarter with a shoulder injury. McGloin was named the Raiders' starting quarterback after Derek Carr suffered a season-ending leg fracture during the previous week.

Notes

This was Gary Kubiak's final game as the Broncos' head coach, as he retired from coaching on the following day due to concerns over his health.

Standings

Division

Conference

Statistics

Team leaders

League rankings

Awards and honors

Pro Bowl and All-Pro selections
Three Broncos were selected to the 2017 Pro Bowl: Linebacker Von Miller and cornerbacks Chris Harris, Jr. and Aqib Talib. All three were also voted to the  All-Pro Team and named to the First Team. Safety Darian Stewart and wide receivers Emmanuel Sanders and Demaryius Thomas were later added to the Pro Bowl roster as replacements.

Other news and notes
 August 25: Executive vice president/general manager John Elway was added to the NFL's competition committee.
 September 7: The Broncos and wide receiver Emmanuel Sanders agreed on a three-year contract extension that will keep Sanders in Denver through the 2019 season. The initial three-year contract that Sanders signed with the Broncos in 2014 was set to expire after the  season.
 September 13: The Broncos' Color Rush uniforms were unveiled, which the team wore during their Week 6 Thursday Night loss at the San Diego Chargers. The uniform kit contained the following features: orange pants, which the team wore for the first time since 1979, orange socks and shoes, as well as block-style numerals trimmed in navy blue that mirrored the team's 1968–96 uniform style.
 November 26: The Broncos and safety Darian Stewart agreed on a four-year contract extension that will keep Stewart in Denver through the 2020 season. The initial two-year contract that Stewart signed with the Broncos in 2015 was set to expire after the 2016 season.

Notes

References

External links

 
 The Denver Post – Complete Broncos Coverage
 2016 Season page on Pro Football Reference
 NFL Nation Blog – ESPN

Denver
Denver Broncos seasons
Denver Broncos